The Stony River (Minnesota) is a river of Minnesota. It flows into the Rainy River.

See also
List of rivers of Minnesota

References
USGS Geographic Names Information Service

Rivers of Minnesota